The Nhandú River is a river in the states of Pará and Mato Grosso, Brazil. It is a tributary of the Teles Pires.

Course

The Nhandú River flows southwest from Pará into Mato Grosso, where it is a right tributary of the Teles Pires.
It defines the eastern boundary of the  Cristalino State Park, created in 2000.

See also
List of rivers of Mato Grosso

References

Sources

Rivers of Mato Grosso
Rivers of Pará